Edouard Kayembe Kayembe (born 3 June 1998) is a Congolese professional footballer who plays as a midfielder for EFL Championship club Watford and the DR Congo national team.

Club career
Kayembe signed his first professional contract on 22 November 2016 with R.S.C. Anderlecht for 4.5 years, joining from the Congolese club Sharks XI FC. He made his professional debut for Anderlecht in a 1–0 Belgian First Division A win over K.A.S. Eupen on 22 December 2017.

On 7 January 2022, Kayembe joined Premier League club Watford on a four-and-a-half year contract.

International career
Kayembe was called up to the DR Congo U20s for the 2017 Jeux de la Francophonie, but did not end up going to the tournament. He represented the DR Congo U23s in a pair of 2019 Africa U-23 Cup of Nations qualification matches in March 2019. 

Kayembe made his senior debut for the DR Congo national football team in a friendly 1–1 draw with Algeria on 10 October 2019.

Career statistics

References

External links
 Anderlecht profile
 Watford profile

1998 births
Living people
People from Kananga
21st-century Democratic Republic of the Congo people
Democratic Republic of the Congo footballers
Democratic Republic of the Congo international footballers
Association football midfielders
Sharks XI FC players
R.S.C. Anderlecht players
K.A.S. Eupen players
Watford F.C. players
Belgian Pro League players
Premier League players
Democratic Republic of the Congo expatriate footballers
Democratic Republic of the Congo expatriate sportspeople in Belgium
Expatriate footballers in Belgium
Democratic Republic of the Congo expatriate sportspeople in England
Expatriate footballers in England